Gavin Warren (born Gavin Hunter Warren on April 17, 2008) is an American actor who is best known for his film role in First Man (2018), his upcoming roles in the films The Unbreakable Boy, Man in the White Van, and Geechee, as well as his television roles in Daybreak (2019) and NCIS: New Orleans (2020).

Early life
Gavin Hunter Warren was born in Houston, Texas. He began his career as a model on Great Day Houston, a morning show that aired on KHOU 11, in 2015. He began his acting career after winning Most Sought After Male at the International Modeling and Talent Association Los Angeles Convention in 2015.

Career

Film acting
In his first film, Back Roads (2018), Warren played a supporting role as the son of Jennifer Morrison and Tom Everett Scott.

Warren played Neil Armstrong's (played by Ryan Gosling) son in First Man (2018). The film is a personal account of Neil Armstrong and his landing on the moon, and was directed by Damien Chazelle, the Academy Award-winning director of La La Land. Warren won the Red Carpet Fashion Award for best dressed for his outfit at the premiere of the film.

Warren also played Rusty in 12 Mighty Orphans (2021). In flashback scenes, he portrays the young version of the lead role played by Luke Wilson. The film also featured Robert Duvall, Martin Sheen, Vinessa Shaw, Wayne Knight, and Treat Williams. The film was written, directed and produced by Ty Roberts, and was based on the true story of an orphanage football team during the Great Depression.

In the flashback scenes of A Hard Problem (2021), Warren played young Ian, the lead role played by John Berchtold. The film was written, directed and produced by the Hazart, the writer/director duo of Kyle Hasday and Matt Stewart. The film is a dramatic story, focusing on the life of Ian.

In The Descendant (working title, post-production), Warren will play the lead character. The film will be directed by Robert Glickert and will star Shailene Garnett, Jeff Ward, and Lusia Strus, alongside Warren.

Warren will also star in the film Geechee (pre-production). In this film, Warren will play the lead role of Axle, the son of Andrea Riseborough. The film will be written and directed by Dubois Ashong and will be produced by Stuart Ford and Jamie Foxx. This supernatural thriller will focus on a family haunted by the descendants of African slaves on the East Coast of the United States.

In The Unbreakable Boy, Warren will play Logan LeRette, who is the younger brother of Austin LeRette, the main character, played by Jacob Laval. The film will feature Zachary Levi as their father, Meghann Fahy as their mother, and Patricia Heston as their grandmother. It will be directed by Jon Gunn, with production by Lionsgate and Kingdom Story. The film will be based on a true story from a book, entitled The Unbreakable Boy: A Father's Fear, A Son's Courage, and A Story of Unconditional Love, written by Austin's father, Scott Michael LeRette, and Suzy Flory.

In Man in the White Van, Warren will play Daniel Williams, the younger brother of Annie (played by Madison Wolfe) and Margaret (played by Brec Bassinger). Sean Astin will play their father, while Ali Larter will play their mother. The film will be directed by Warren Skeels and will be produced by Legion M. This film will be based on a true story from 1974 about a white van stalking women in Florida.

Television acting
Warren played in a flashback episode of Daybreak (2019) as young Josh Wheeler, the lead role played by Colin Ford. This Netflix show was directed by Brad Peyton and Michael Patrick Jann.

Warren also played in a flashback episode NCIS: New Orleans (2020) as young Dwayne Pride, the lead role played by Scott Bakula. The episode was directed and produced by James Hayman.

Filmography

Film

Television

Internet

References

Further reading 
'First Man': A troubled landing
Katy’s Newest Superstar! – Swoon Katy
'First Man' is a first rate movie
Did Neil Armstrong really have THAT talk with his kids like Ryan Gosling in 'First Man'?

External links

 on IMDb

2008 births
Living people
Male actors from Houston